Maurice Ptito (born June 11, 1946 in Casablanca, Morocco) is Professor of Visual Neuroscience at the School of Optometry (Université de Montréal). He is also an Adjunct Professor of Neurology and Neurosurgery at the Montreal Neurological Institute (McGill University) and Guest Professor at the Danish Research Center for Magnetic Resonance (University of Copenhagen). He currently holds the Harland Sanders Research Chair in Vision Science.

Education
Dr Ptito obtained his Ph.D. in Experimental Neuropsychology from Université de Montréal and a doctorat in Health Sciences (Doctor Medicinae) from the University of Aarhus (Denmark). He trained as post-doctoral fellow in Neurophysiology at Stanford University Medical School (California) under the mentorship of Professor Karl H. Pribram.

Career
Dr Ptito has authored more than 150 scientific publications and has received several awards and prizes, including the Sir John William Dawson Medal of the Royal Society of Canada and the Henry and Karla Hensen Prize (Denmark). He is a Fellow of the Royal Society of Canada, the Canadian Psychological Association, the American Academy of Optometry, and the Royal Danish Academy of Sciences and Letters.

Maurice Ptito is a specialist in the study of Development and Plasticity of the visual system in various species including Man. The major goal of his research is the understanding of the mechanisms involved in Visual Plasticity in normal developing individuals, as well as those who were born without vision or lost their vision later in life. His laboratory has been using a wide variety of techniques including anatomy (diffusion tensor imaging, voxel-based morphometry), physiology (visually evoked potentials), positron emission tomography (PET), functional magnetic resonance imaging (fMRI), transcranial magnetic stimulation (TMS) and psychophysics to study human blindness.

With colleague, Dr Ron Kupers (University of Copenhagen), he used a sensory substitution device coined the Tongue Display Unit (TDU) that converts visual images into electrotactile pulses applied to the tongue via a grid made out of tiny electrodes. He demonstrated the presence of cross-modal plastic processes that enable the blind to "see" using the tongue as a portal to the visual cortex. This approach holds great promise for the blind in improving their quality of life, helping them to navigate freely in their environment.

Honours
In 2013, he was made a Knight of the National Order of Quebec.

Personal
Maurice Ptito lives in Montreal (Qc, Canada) and in Copenhagen (Denmark). He has four daughters and seven grandchildren:
Zoe, Zachary, Noa, Maïka, Manou, Maël and Lilly. He is married to Sara Normann Thordsen.

References

1946 births
Living people
Canadian neuroscientists
Knights of the National Order of Quebec